The Indian Cricket League (ICL) was a private cricket league funded by Zee Entertainment Enterprises that operated between 2007 and 2009 in India. Its two seasons included tournaments between four international teams (World XI, India, Pakistan and Bangladesh) and separate tournaments between nine domestic teams notionally located in major Indian cities as well as Lahore, Pakistan and Dhaka, Bangladesh. 

The matches were played in the Twenty20 format, and was the first domestic Twenty20 league in India. There was also a planned domestic 50-over tournament, but this did not happen. The ICL lacked the support of the Board of Control for Cricket in India and International Cricket Council, which placed it at a major disadvantage when compared to other cricket competitions. 

In 2008 the Board of Control for Cricket in India launched the their own Indian Premier League. ICL was an unsanctioned league. It is dubbed as "rebel league" by Indian media due to its fights with BCCI. 

BCCI banned those who involved in ICL by the BCCI and other cricket authorities, led to the league's folding in 2009.

Background
'Rebel' cricket leagues and fixtures played without backing from international boards and the International Cricket Council had been attempted before. Most notably, World Series Cricket, introduced in 1977 by broadcasting tycoon Kerry Packer, had proved the viability of cricket as a commercial product despite the league's short lifespan. In the 1980s, many international cricketers toured South Africa whilst the country was under a sporting boycott due to apartheid, often sponsored by private companies. Both these attempts resulted in pushback from international cricket authorities. World Series Cricket were the subject of litigation, and were not perimitted to use recognised cricket stadiums or language like 'Test Match', so had to instead use stadiums intended for other sports and invent new terminology such as 'Supertest'. In the case of the latter, many cricketers received bans from their respective national teams for participating in these tours. As a result, the tours eventually came to an end, a few years before apartheid ended in South Africa and the sporting boycott was lifted.

In the early 2000s, the England and Wales Cricket Board (ECB) were looking for a way to market the game to a younger audience. Their solution was a new twenty-over competition to be played between counties. The resulting Twenty20 Cup, later renamed the T20 Blast, was a success and drew large crowds during its first season in 2003. Similar competitions sprung up in Pakistan, Australia and the West Indies. Eventually, the ICC sanctioned the first official Men's T20 World Cup in 2007.

The Board of Control for Cricket in India sent a young side to participate in the World Cup, due to their skepticism over the format's viability. Despite their inexperience, the Indian side won the tournament. Two months later, the inaugural season of the Indian Cricket League began without backing from the BCCI, who deemed the participants 'rebels' and excluded them from the Indian side.

League structure
Each team was coached by a former international cricketer and composed of four international, two Indian and eight budding domestic players. Essel Group also planned to set up cricket academies all over the country. The Board of Control for Cricket in India (BCCI) was assured that it was free to draw from ICL's talent pool. The league became active in November 2007 with matches in the Twenty20 format.

Former international cricketers including Anjingsora Risora, Tony Greig, Dean Jones and Kiran More were hired as board members of the Indian Cricket League. The board positions were to be paid positions.

City Teams 
Nine of the teams were club teams located in major cities in India, as well as Lahore in Pakistan and Dhaka in Bangladesh. These teams participated in two of the ICL's competitions: the Indian Championship and the Grand Championship. The Indian Championship originally did not include Lahore or Ahmedabad, which were introduced in the Grand Championship later that season. The Dhaka team were introduced in the 2008-09 Indian Championship, the only competition to feature all 9 teams.
Mumbai Champs
Chennai Superstars
Chandigarh Lions
Hyderabad Heroes
 Royal Bengal Tigers (Kolkata)
 Delhi Giants
Ahmedabad Rockets
Lahore Badshahs
Dhaka Warriors
  Each team had a paid mentor, media manager, psychologist and physiotherapist
  There was a US$1 million prize for the winning club team
  An Ombudsman was available to look into grievances of players

ICL World teams
The ICL World teams participated in an additional competition, the ICL World Series. They did not play against the city teams.

ICL World XI

Chris Harris
Damien Martyn
Chris Cairns – Captain
Ian Harvey
Jimmy Maher
Johan van der Wath
Lou Vincent – Wicket-Keeper 
Marvan Atapattu
Matthew Elliot
Michael Kasprowicz
Russel Arnold

ICL India

Steve Rixon – Coach
Rajagopal Satish – Captain
Abbas Ali
Abhishek Jhunjhunwala
Abu Nacheem
Ali Murtaza
Ambati Rayudu
Ganapathi Vignesh
Ibrahim Khaleel – Wicket-Keeper 
Love Ablish
Ravi Raj Patil
Rohan Gavaskar
Stuart Binny
Syed Mohammed
Thiru Kumaran
TP Sudhindra
Sarbjit Singh
Sumit Kumar – Wicket-Keeper 
Tejinder Pal Singh
V. Sarvanan
A. Ansuman

ICL Pakistan

Moin Khan – Coach
Inzamam-ul-Haq – Captain
Azhar Mahmood
Taufeeq Umar
Imran Farhat
Rana Naved-ul-Hasan
Abdul Razzaq
Naved Latif
Humayun Farhat
Shahid Nazir
Hasan Raza
Mohammad Sami
Imran Nazir
Riaz Afridi
Shabbir Ahmed

ICL Bangladesh

 Balwinder Sandhu – Coach
 Habibul Bashar – Captain
 Aftab Ahmed
 Alok Kapali
 Dhiman Ghosh
 Farhad Reza
 Manjural Islam
 Golam Mabud
 Mahbubul Karim
 Mohammad Rafique
 Mohammad Sharif
 Mosharraf Hossain
 Shahriar Nafees
 Tapash Baisya

Tournaments

First season

Second season

Reasons for creation

The "Inverted Pyramid" cricket structure 

There was a wide disparity between the facilities enjoyed by the national team and the regional ones. This made the regional players far from finished products when they are called to represent their country, preventing a huge country like India from having adequate reserve strength in the national squad when key players are injured or retire. Also, the regional cricket boards depend on the BCCI for hand-outs of funds for infrastructure and grassroots development. The players who are entrenched at the top have strong backing from sports management firms and also can afford the best in personal trainers, physiotherapists and technical consultants, which are well beyond the scope of the average player.

Zee Telefilms desire to create sports content

Cricket played in India generates Rs. 10 billion in advertising and subscription revenue and Essel Group chairman Subhash Chandra had been acutely aware of his company missing out on this money. The Essel group had expressed a keen desire to help India develop cricketing talent, as well as provide lucrative sports programming for Zee Telefilms, which lost out on the rights to broadcast all BCCI-sanctioned cricket matches in India until 2011.

Essel Group had originally launched Zee Sports earlier with the anticipation of securing at least some of the BCCI telecast rights in 2006. This was followed by Zee acquiring 50 percent in TEN Sports in November 2006 for Rs. 2.57 billion. This gave the company a few international cricket rights – West Indies, Sri Lanka and Pakistan.

During his battle with BCCI and ESPN Star Sports for the five-year telecast rights in August–September 2004 in the Bombay High Court, Chandra was present every day for the hearings. Despite Zee bidding the highest at $307 million, BCCI and its then president Jagmohan Dalmiya denied him the rights.

The pain of denial had been with Chandra since 2000 when the ICC World Cup rights were sold to NewsCorp's Global Cricket Corporation (GCC) for $550 million despite Zee bidding the highest at $650 million citing Zee's insufficient sports marketing experience.

In August 2005, Zee again emerged as a forerunner with a pitch of over $340 million while ESPN Star Sports, the other principal contender, was believed to have offered around $325 million. BCCI took the stance that Zee was not qualified as a specialist broadcaster and refused to consider Zee's proposal. The matter expectedly went to court and Doordarshan emerged the beneficiary.

Chandra then tried the political route too and supported Sharad Pawar's candidature as BCCI president against Dalmiya. Pawar emerged victorious but not Chandra. In the last round of bidding in February 2006, it was Nimbus who bagged BCCI's telecast rights till 2011 for $613 million with Zee trailing at $513 million.

Since there was a Zee-Nimbus alliance before the bidding, media pundits thought Nimbus' bid was a Zee front. But Nimbus chose to go its own way and launched its own sports network – NEO Sports. In 2012, Star Sports bought broadcasting rights for international and domestic matches in India for more than $550 million.

Support for the league

The ICL received some support from unexpected quarters. There was a fear that lack of access to infrastructure, like the premier cricket stadiums, would limit the success of the operation of the league, but support from various government bodies boosted the league. Camps were held at Mayajaal in Chennai, a private resort with adequate cricket facilities. The then head of Indian Railways Lalu Prasad Yadav showed his backing by opening all the cricket stadiums controlled by the Indian Railways to the league. Describing the ICL as a "good initiative", Prasad issued a statement saying that the BCCI and ICL should each come up with a cricket team and play against each other to show who's the best. The state government of West Bengal also agreed to rent its cricket grounds, notably Eden Gardens, to the league. In Ahmedabad, Ahmedabad Municipal Corporation provided its Sardar Vallabhbhai Patel Stadium for matches.

Controversy

BCCI Response

The BCCI refused to recognise the ICL as a cricket league, and criticised Kiran More and Kapil Dev for joining the ICL. Kapil Dev's association with ICL was seen by the establishment as a conflict of interest as he was also the chairman of National Cricket Academy, a BCCI owned cricket facility. On 21 August 2007 Kapil Dev was sacked from his NCA post. Subhash Chandra had earlier stated that the ICL will go ahead regardless of the BCCI's stance. The International Cricket Council gave a statement through its chief executive, Malcolm Speed, that the ICC would not recognize the ICL unless the BCCI chooses to recognise it. The ICC looks at the ICL as an issue to be sorted out by the BCCI. On 25 July 2012 Kapil Dev informed BCCI that he had resigned from the ICL.

Faced with the threat of young players joining the ICL, the BCCI jacked up prize money for winners, runners-up and losing semi-finalists across all tournaments. An average domestic cricketer can hope to make around Rs 35,000 per match day from the season of 2007–08: more than double the Rs 16,000 they got in 2005–06. The BCCI has also planned to do away with honorary selectors, who will be paid professionals from September 2008 onwards.

The BCCI started its own international Twenty20 league. The official league, which launched in April 2008, is called the Indian Premier League. The league model is based on the franchise model of the National Football League and Major League Baseball in the US.

ICL takes BCCI to court

In August 2007, the ICL filed a petition against the BCCI in the Delhi High Court accusing the BCCI of threatening and intimidating them and other state organisations, and asked the court to stop BCCI from interfering with its attempts to sign up players for its tournaments. It also petitioned that the BCCI stop trying to "out-hire" cricket stadiums in India that are owned by the state governments, in anti-competitive attempts to stop the ICL from using them to play matches.

On 27 August 2007, the Delhi High Court ruled in favour of the ICL. In its ruling, the Delhi High Court said that players should not suffer in the battle between corporate giants. The court has issued notices to all corporate sponsors, the state cricket associations & the BCCI against terminating valid contracts of players joining the ICL.

The Monopolies and Restrictive Trade Practices Commission (MRTPC) of India had asked its Director-General of Investigation to do an initial investigation into the BCCI's action against players who had joined the ICL. The investigation was based on media reports of the BCCI giving an open statement that it would ban players who join ICL. It was also reported in the media that all state associations, under direction from the BCCI, have cancelled contracts with players.

Pressure on players from other national organisations 
In considering rejoining the ICL former England wicketkeeper Paul Nixon was said to have put his career in jeopardy because any player that signs up with the ICL, which does not have official status from the International Cricket Council, risks losing their registration.

The addition of a new team from Dhaka in Bangladesh, consisting largely of Bangladesh internationals caused more controversy as the cricket board of that country banned the players for 10 years for joining the 'rebel' ICL. Faced with the departure of so many players the board appealed to other Bangladeshi players to reject the new ICL team, stay loyal to the board and embrace the opportunity to play for their country.

Downfall of the ICL

The future of ICL became uncertain when BCCI banned ICL players from playing international matches. Since then many ICL players have returned to their national team including famous players like Shane Bond (retired) and Abdul Razzaq (also retired).

BCCI after seeing the success of ICL wanted to start their own league called IPL. Due to this, the BCCI began to ban players and stadiums associated with the ICL.

Shortly before the conclusion of the inaugural tournament, the ICL announced its plans for expansion, which include a fifty over tournament in February 2008, and the expansion of the ICL Indian Championship to eight teams for the second tournament, due to be held in September and October 2008. However, the ICL eventually came to an end after all its players dropped out. This was because of the offer of amnesty given by BCCI to players choosing to leave the ICL.

Transparency issues 

Independent analysts have had difficulty gauging the financial viability of the ICL due to the lack of transparency of the league's operations. Terms of contracts are hidden and advertising revenue from match telecasts – considered to be a major contributor to revenues – have never been disclosed. Because they are unsanctioned by the ICC, the teams do not have access to the best facilities across the whole country or access to the best players, limiting their ability to generate high gate revenues. This lack of transparency leads to questions regarding the overall viability of the ICL's business model.

Broadcasting of ICL
Since the ICL was conducted by Zee Telefilms, the ICL was broadcast in most domains on the Zee network.

Broadcasting ban 
In November 2008, the Bangladeshi government set a ban on the broadcasting of live matches of the ICL on the privately held Diganta TV channel in the country. This would extend to the ICL World Series featuring the country's national team.

References

External links
Official site of the Indian Cricket League
Diktat ideas for BCCI to crush ICL

 
2007 establishments in India
Professional sports leagues in India
Cricket leagues in India
Defunct sports leagues in India
Sports leagues established in 2007
Defunct cricket leagues
Sport in India